Nyberg is a Swedish surname.

Geographical distribution
As of 2014, 53.6% of all known bearers of the surname Nyberg were residents of Sweden (frequency 1:763), 23.6% of the United States (1:63,679), 12.2% of Finland (1:1,868), 4.5% of Norway (1:4,731), 1.6% of Canada (1:98,390) and 1.4% of Denmark (1:16,602).

In Sweden, the frequency of the surname was higher than national average (1:763) in the following counties:
 1. Västernorrland County (1:252)
 2. Gotland County (1:359)
 3. Norrbotten County (1:371)
 4. Västerbotten County (1:493)
 5. Gävleborg County (1:504)
 6. Dalarna County (1:542)
 7. Uppsala County (1:648)
 8. Västmanland County (1:761)

In Finland, the frequency of the surname was higher than national average (1:1,868) in the following regions:
 1. Åland (1:489)
 2. Ostrobothnia (1:610)
 3. Uusimaa (1:901)
 4. Central Ostrobothnia (1:1,393)

People
 Anita Nyberg (born 1940), Swedish professor
 Arne Nyberg (1913–1970), Swedish footballer
 Arto Nyberg (born 1966), Finnish journalist
 Arvid Nyberg (born 1928), Norwegian politician
 Björn Nyberg (1929–2004), Swedish fantasy author
 Börje Nyberg (1920–2005), Swedish actor and film director
 Carl Richard Nyberg (1858–1939), Swedish industrialist
 Claes Nyberg (born 1971), Swedish former long-distance runner
 Christina Nyberg (born 1962), Swedish chess player
 Eric Nyberg (born 19??), American computer scientist
 Eva Nyberg (born 1969), Swedish swimmer
 Evert Nyberg (1925–2000), Swedish long-distance runner
 Fredrik Nyberg (writer) (born 1968), Swedish writer
 Fredrik Nyberg (born 1969), Swedish alpine skier
 Gun-Britt Nyberg, Swedish orienteering competitor
 Henrik Samuel Nyberg (1889–1974), Swedish orientalist
 Herman Nyberg (1880–1968), Swedish sailor
 Ingeborg Nyberg (born 1940), Swedish singer and actress
 Jaakko Nyberg (born 1980), Finnish footballer
 John Nyberg (born 1996), Swedish professional ice hockey player, NHL
 Julia Nyberg (1784–1854), Swedish poet
 Kaisa Nyberg (born 1948), Finnish cryptographer
 Karen Nyberg (born 1969), American astronaut
 Katarina Nyberg (born 1965), Swedish curler
 Katja Nyberg (born 1979), Norwegian handball player
 Lars Nyberg (born 1951), Swedish Civilekonom and CEO of TeliaSonera
 Lina Nyberg (born 1970), Swedish jazz singer
 Mary Ann Nyberg (1923–1979), American costume designer 
 Nico Nyberg (born 1993), Finnish ice hockey player
 René Nyberg (born 1946), Finnish diplomat and a former CEO of East Office
 Renée Nyberg (born 1966), Swedish television presenter and journalist
 Thomas Nyberg (born 1962), Swedish sprinter

References

Swedish-language surnames